The Hippodrome Theatre or Wabash Theatre is a historic theater in Terre Haute, Indiana, USA.

Theater manager Theodore W. Barhydt decided to build a theater in the area and enlisted the help of noted theater architect John Eberson to design the building. The German Renaissance structure officially opened on February 15, 1915, with a grand opening celebration attended by local dignitaries such as Indiana governor Samuel M. Ralston and vaudeville moguls like Joseph M. Finn, Marcus Heiman, and Asher Levy.

The building was placed on the National Register of Historic Places in 1983.

References

Theatres on the National Register of Historic Places in Indiana
Renaissance Revival architecture in Indiana
Theatres completed in 1915
Buildings and structures in Vigo County, Indiana
National Register of Historic Places in Vigo County, Indiana